The Port Vell Aerial Tramway is an aerial tramway in Barcelona, Catalonia, Spain. It crosses Port Vell, Barcelona's old harbour, connecting the Montjuïc hill with the seaside suburb of Barceloneta.

The aerial tramway first opened in 1931 and is principally a tourist attraction, used on account of its excellent views of the city and its port. It is operated by Teleféricos de Barcelona S.A. and is not part of Autoritat del Transport Metropolità (ATM) integrated fare network. Separate tickets must be purchased prior to boarding.

The aerial tramway should not be confused with the Montjuïc Cable Car, a gondola lift that links the upper terminus of the Montjuïc funicular with Montjuïc Castle.

Route 

The ride offers a fine view over Barcelona, the nearby Plaça del Portal de la Pau with the Columbus Monument, Port Vell with its Balearic ferries and the World Trade Centre, and Barceloneta with its Mediterranean beaches. The tower Torre Jaume I was the world's highest aerial lift pylon until 1966, when the Glacial Aerial Tramway Kaprun III opened.

History 
The tramway was intended to be an attraction at the 1929 Barcelona International Exposition, a World's fair. The Air Rail San Sebastian-Miramar, S.A. was incorporated and obtained the royal licence to build and operate the tramway. The manager of the project was Juan Rodriguez Roda. The towers were designed by the architect Carles Buigas and built by Material para Ferrocarriles y Construcciones S.A.. The tramway was built by Bleichert, at that time a company with a worldwide reputation, which had just completed the Aeri de Montserrat. However, the size of the project was underestimated and the tramway did not open until 12 September 1931.

Initially, the tramway consisted of two sections with two cars each. The cabins travelled from the terminal stations to Torre Jaume I and back, with one haul rope for the total length to move all four cabins.

All hopes for a commercial success of the venture were annihilated in the Great Depression and in the Spanish Civil War (1936–1939). Torre Jaume I was used as a look-out and a machine gun post. The tramway was heavily damaged and reduced to the rusting towers. One of the two surviving cabins was transferred to Aeri de Montserrat, which started to operate again in 1940. There were discussions to demolish the installation completely. Eventually, Friedrich Gründel, Bleichert's chief engineer during construction, succeeded in establishing Teleféricos de Barcelona, S.A.. In 1960, Torre Sebastià reopened with a new restaurant at its top, followed two years later by Torre Jaume I. In 1963 the tramway reopened with only two cabins, which travelled along the total length and through the top of Torre Jaume I. After Gründel's death ownership changed several times, commercial returns diminished and the technical status deteriorated. The authorities had decided to close it, when, in 1996, Barcelona decided to redevelop Port Vell and to build the World Trade Centre. The tramway was also renovated and it reopened in 2000.

Technical details 

Tower names 
Jaume I is the Catalan name of James I of Aragon (1208–1276), King of Aragon and Count of Barcelona. Sant Sebastià is the Catalan name of San Sebastián, the Spanish town where in 1907, Leonardo Torres Quevedo had opened his first public aerial tramway on Monte Ulia.

References

External links 
 
 Official web site of the aerial tramway

Aerial lifts in Catalonia
Aerial tramways
Transport in Barcelona
Aerial tramways in Spain
1931 establishments in Spain